The Texas Rangers 1984 season involved the Rangers' finishing 7th in the American League West, with a record of 69 wins and 92 losses.

Offseason 
 November 21, 1983: Marv Foley was signed as a free agent by the Rangers.
 December 7, 1983: John Butcher and Mike Smithson were traded by the Rangers to the Minnesota Twins for Gary Ward and Sam Sorce (minors).
 December 8, 1983: Jim Sundberg was traded by the Rangers to the Milwaukee Brewers for Ned Yost and Dan Scarpetta (minors).
 January 17, 1984: Gordon Dillard was drafted by the Rangers in the 2nd round of the 1984 Major League Baseball draft, but did not sign.
 January 27, 1984: Tommy Boggs was signed as a free agent by the Rangers.

Regular season 
 May 6, 1984: Cal Ripken Jr. of the Baltimore Orioles hit for the cycle in a game against the Rangers.

Season standings

Record vs. opponents

Notable transactions 
 May 25, 1984: Mike Richardt was traded by the Rangers to the Houston Astros for Alan Bannister.
 July 2, 1984: The Rangers traded players to be named later to the Chicago Cubs for Dickie Noles. The Rangers completed the deal by sending Tim Henry (minors) and Jorge Gomez (minors) to the Cubs on December 11.

Roster

Game log

Regular season

|-style=background:#fbb
| 6 || April 10 || 12:30p.m. CST || @ Tigers || 1–5 || Petry (2–0) || Stewart (0–2) || – || 2:32 || 51,238 || 2–4 || L2
|-style=background:#fbb
| 7 || April 12 || 12:30p.m. CST || @ Tigers || 4–9 || Morris (3–0) || Tanana (0–1) || – || 2:48 || 19,154 || 2–5 || L3
|-style=background:#fbb
| 18 || April 25 || 7:35p.m. CST || Tigers || 4–9 || Wilcox (2–0) || Stewart (0–5) || Hernández (2) || 2:38 || 25,883 || 8–10 || L2
|-style=background:#fbb
| 19 || April 26 || 7:35p.m. CST || Tigers || 5–7 || Bair (2–0) || Tanana (2–2) || López (2) || 2:50 || 13,559 || 8–11 || L3
|-

|-

|-

|-style=background:#fbb
| 84 || July 5 || 7:35p.m. CDT || Tigers || 4–7 || López (7–0) || Hough (8–7) || Hernández (15) || 2:26 || 15,151 || 36–48 || L3
|-style=background:#cfc
| 85 || July 6 || 7:35p.m. CDT || Tigers || 5–3 || Mason (6–6) || Berenguer (4–7) || Schmidt (4) || 2:42 || 22,378 || 37–48 || W1
|-style=background:#fbb
| 86 || July 7 || 7:35p.m. CDT || Tigers || 2–5 || Rozema (5–1) || Darwin (5–5) || Hernández (16) || 2:41 || 29,262 || 37–49 || L1
|-style=background:#cfc
| 87 || July 8 || 7:35p.m. CDT || Tigers || 9–7 || Tanana (9–8) || Bair (4–2) || Schmidt (5) || 2:37 || 16,010 || 38–48 || W1
|-style=background:#bbbfff
|colspan="12"|55th All-Star Game in San Francisco, CA
|-style=background:#fbb
| 95 || July 19 || 6:35p.m. CDT || @ Tigers || 2–9 || Wilcox (9–6) || Stewart (4–11) || – || 2:32 || 26,908 || 40–55 || L2
|-style=background:#fbb
| 96 || July 20 || 6:35p.m. CDT || @ Tigers || 1–3 || Rozema (7–1) || Tanana (9–9) || Hernández (18) || 2:16 || 39,484 || 40–56 || L3
|-style=background:#fbb
| 97 || July 21 || 6:35p.m. CDT || @ Tigers || 6–7 || Monge (1–0) || Noles (1–1) || Hernández (19) || 2:38 || 46,219 || 40–57 || L4
|-style=background:#fbb
| 98 || July 22 || 12:30p.m. CDT || @ Tigers || 0–2 || Petry (13–4) || Hough (10–8) || Hernández (20) || 2:11 || 37,846 || 66–29 || L5
|-

|-

|-

|- style="text-align:center;"
| Legend:       = Win       = Loss       = PostponementBold = Rangers team member

Player stats

Batting

Starters by position 
Note: Pos = Position; G = Games played; AB = At bats; H = Hits; Avg. = Batting average; HR = Home runs; RBI = Runs batted in

Other batters 
Note: G = Games played; AB = At bats; H = Hits; Avg. = Batting average; HR = Home runs; RBI = Runs batted in

Pitching

Starting pitchers 
Note: G = Games pitched; IP = Innings pitched; W = Wins; L = Losses; ERA = Earned run average; SO = Strikeouts

Other pitchers 
Note: G = Games pitched; IP = Innings pitched; W = Wins; L = Losses; ERA = Earned run average; SO = Strikeouts

Relief pitchers 
Note: G = Games pitched; W = Wins; L = Losses; SV = Saves; ERA = Earned run average; SO = Strikeouts

Awards and honors 
Buddy Bell, 3B, Gold Glove 1984
Buddy Bell, 3B, Silver Slugger Award, 1984
All-Star Game

Farm system 

LEAGUE CHAMPIONS: Tri-City, GCL Rangers

Notes

References 
1984 Texas Rangers at Baseball Reference
1984 Texas Rangers at Baseball Almanac

Texas Rangers seasons
Texas Rangers season
Texas Rang